Steve or Steven Jones may refer to:

Arts and entertainment 
Steve Jones (English presenter) (born 1945), English musician, disk jockey, television presenter, and voice-over artist
Steve Jones (musician) (born 1955), English rock and roll guitarist and singer, member of the Sex Pistols
Steven Philip Jones (born 1960), American writer; see The White Ship
Steve Jones (Welsh presenter) (born 1977), Welsh television presenter
Steve Jones (fl. 1980s), American musician (The Unforgiven) and television producer

Science and medicine
Steve Jones (biologist) (born 1944), Welsh geneticist 
Steven E. Jones (born 1949), American physicist and researcher
Steve G. Jones (born 1967), American clinical hypnotherapist

Sports

Association football (soccer)
Steve Jones (footballer, born 1955), English footballer
Steve Jones (footballer, born 1957), English footballer
Steve Jones (footballer, born 1960), English footballer
Steve Jones (footballer, born 1962), Welsh footballer
Steve Jones (footballer, born 1964), Welsh footballer
Steve Jones (footballer, born March 1970), English footballer
Steve Jones (footballer, born December 1970), English footballer
Steve Jones (footballer, born 1976), Northern Irish international footballer

Rugby
Steve Jones (rugby union, born 1951) (1951–2007), Welsh rugby union player
Steve Jones (rugby union, born 1977), Welsh rugby union player
Steve Jones (rugby union, born 1983), English rugby union player
Steve Jones (rugby league), rugby league footballer who played in the 2000s

Other sports
Steve Jones (baseball) (born 1941), American baseball pitcher
Steve "Snapper" Jones (1942–2017), American basketball player
Steve Jones (cricketer) (born 1949), Australian cricketer
Steve Jones (American football) (born 1951), American football player
Steve Jones (runner) (born 1955), Welsh athlete
Steve Jones (cyclist) (born 1957), British cyclist
Steve Jones (golfer) (born 1958), American golfer
Steve Jones, alias used in Wales in the 1980s of professional wrestler William Regal

Others
Steve C. Jones (born 1957), American judge, United States District Court for the Northern District of Georgia
Steve Jones (aviator) (born 1960), British pilot
Steven Edward Jones, perpetrator of the 2015 Northern Arizona University shooting

See also
Stephen Jones (disambiguation)
Staff Jones (born 1959), Wales international rugby union footballer who played in the 1980s